Fodé Camara (born 17 April 1998) is a Guinean professional footballer who plays as a left back.

Club career
Born in Guinea, Camara went through the CEFOMIG youth academy before moving to SC Bastia in 2016. On 13 June 2018, he joined Gazélec Ajaccio on a three-year deal from Bastia. He made his professional debut for Gazélec Ajaccio in a 1–1 Ligue 2 tie with Paris FC on 27 July 2018.

On 9 July 2019, Camara signed with Greek champions Olympiacos F.C. who loaned him back to Gazélec Ajaccio for the 2019–20 season.

In September 2020, he moved to Super League Greece 2 side Chania FC on loan for the 2020–21 season, along with teammate Nemanja Nikolić.

On 10 February 2023, he signed for Novi Sad as a free agent.

International career
Camara represented the Guinea U17s at the 2015 African U-17 Championship, and the 2015 FIFA U-17 World Cup.

References

External links
 
 
 

1998 births
Living people
Sportspeople from Conakry
Guinean footballers
Association football fullbacks
Guinea youth international footballers
2019 Africa Cup of Nations players
Ligue 2 players
Championnat National 2 players
Serbian First League players
Gazélec Ajaccio players
Olympiacos F.C. players
RFK Novi Sad 1921 players
Guinean expatriate footballers
Guinean expatriate sportspeople in France
Expatriate footballers in France